Lior Shamriz (born September 13, 1978) is a writer, producer, and film director. They reside in Santa Cruz, California.

Career
Born to an Iraqi-Iranian Jewish family in Ashkelon, a city in southern Israel, they skipped the army at 18 and moved to Tel Aviv where they began working on collective art publications and computer generated music. They attended the Sam Spiegel Film and Television School until being expelled in 2004. Critical of Zionism and Israeli nationalism in press interviews and in their film work, Shamriz immigrated to Berlin in 2006, pursuing graduate studies at the Institute for Time Based Media of the Berlin University of the Arts.

Dimitri Eipides from the Thessaloniki International Film Festival noted that Shamriz "develops his own écriture, experimenting with form, deconstructing narratives and reconstructing their pieces into something unique, which bears his own personal trademark".

Their first long film, Japan Japan (2006-2007), a micro-budget independent production, was presented at about fifty international film festivals, among them the Locarno International Film Festival, the Sarajevo Film Festival, Buenos Aires International Festival of Independent Cinema and MoMA's New Directors/New Films Festival where chief film curator Rajendra Roy had noted it as one of the top ten film of the year. A controversial and polarizing film, it tells a kaleidoscopic story of a young queer pacifist drop-out who is unable to leave Israel, juxtaposing saturated pop music, pixelated virtual travelogues with poetry by Constantine P. Cavafy and Charles Olson, together with dramatic scenes and pornographic imagery.
 
Saturn Returns (2009), their next long film, premiered opening Torino Film Festival's Onde, was nominated for the Max Ophüls Preis at the film festival in Saarbrücken, Germany and co-won the New Berlin Award at Achtung Berlin film festival. Return Return (2010), a non-narrative video based on clips from Saturn Returns, premiered at the 60th Berlin Film Festival’s Forum Expanded, where later The Runaway Troupe of the Cartesian Theater (2013) and Cancelled Faces (2015) would have their world premiere as well. In addition to long films they created many short films, winning awards at the International Short Film Festival Oberhausen in 2013, 2014 and 2015

In 2021, Shamriz was one of the participants in John Greyson's experimental short documentary film International Dawn Chorus Day.

Filmography
(2005) Return to the Savanna (6 Short Movies, approx. 75 min)
(2006) Ho! Terrible Exteriors (28 min)
(2007) The Farewell (Film)|The Farewell (45 min)
(2007) Before the flowers of friendship faded friendship faded (7 min)
(2007) Japan Japan (65 min)
(2008) The vacuum cleaner (8 min)
(2008) The Magic Desk (10 min)
(2009) Saturn Returns (90 min)
(2010) Ritenuto (63 min) – Saturn Returns - Satellite Film
(2010) Titan (50 min) – Saturn Returns - Satellite Film
(2010) Return Return (26 min) – Saturn Returns - Satellite Film
(2011) Mirrors For Princes (60 min)
(2012) A Low Life Mythology (80 min)
(2012) Beyond Love and Friendship (18 min)
(2013) The Present of Cinema (7 min) (commissioned by International Short Film Festival Oberhausen)
(2013) The way of the Shaman (multiscreen video installation with Naama Yuria)
(2013) The Runaway Troupe of the Cartesian Theater (18 min)
(2014) L'amour sauvage (25 min)
(2014-2015) 6 music videos for Kreidler (6 videos, approx. 35 min)
(2015) The night (7 min)
(2015) Cancelled Faces (80 min)
(2016) Fallen Blossoms (70 min)
(2017) The Cage (65 min)

References

External links
 
 

Israeli film directors
Film people from Berlin
1978 births
Living people
People from Ashkelon
Israeli people of Iraqi-Jewish descent
Israeli people of Iranian-Jewish descent